Charles Thorp,  (13 October 1783 – 10 October 1862) was an English churchman, rector of the parish of Ryton and, later, Archdeacon of Durham and the first warden of the University of Durham.

Life
He was born in Gateshead, County Durham, the son of Robert Thorp, Archdeacon of Northumberland, and educated at the Royal Grammar School, Newcastle and Durham School. In 1799, he entered Peterhouse, Cambridge and then University College, Oxford where he graduated BA (1803) and MA (1806). He became a Fellow and Tutor at University College, Oxford, in 1806, deacon in 1806 and priest in 1807.

He then became rector of Ryton in 1811, joining a prestigious group with previous rectors including Thomas Secker, later Archbishop of Canterbury. After his time as rector of Holy Cross Church, Ryton, he became Canon (1829) and then Archdeacon of Durham in 1831 and, a year later, became the first warden of the University of Durham. Thorp remained heavily involved with the university, also being the first master of University College. This was a position he held until his death in Durham in 1862. He was buried at Ryton Church. He had married twice.

Achievements
Charles Thorp's life was remarkable for a number of notable achievements: 
Regarding education for all as necessary and empowering, he was a prime mover in introducing free education to Ryton. 
A committed anti-slavery campaigner, he worked with the Church Missionary Society to set up a university in Freetown, Sierra Leone, to ensure that freed slaves had access to education.
An environmentalist well ahead of his time, he planted Ryton's churchyard with oak, sweet chestnut and beech trees, now in their maturity. 
In a similar far sighted move, he arranged for his family to buy the Farne Islands, employing a wildlife warden  to protect threatened bird species.
As an innovator in alleviating poverty, he set up this country's first 'penny bank', in Ryton, allowing those with small incomes to borrow at rates they could afford.

He was elected a Fellow of the Royal Society in May 1839.

His name was chosen as the identity of a secondary school in West Gateshead in 2011, Charles Thorp Comprehensive School (now Thorp Academy), following the amalgamation of Hookergate School and Ryton Comprehensive School, on the site of the school he sponsored in his lifetime.

References

1784 births
1862 deaths
People from Gateshead
Archdeacons of Durham
Vice-Chancellors and Wardens of Durham University
Fellows of the Royal Society
Surtees Society